Eubranchus horii is a species of sea slug or nudibranch, a marine gastropod mollusc in the family Eubranchidae.

Distribution
This species was described from Hayama, Sagami Bay, Japan. Additional specimens included in the original description were from Tannowa, Osaka Bay; from among a hydroid colony on Ecklonia leaves at Mukaishima, Seto Inland Sea and from Abugashima, Toyama Bay. It has been photographed at Kurosaki, Toyama Bay.

References

Eubranchidae
Gastropods described in 1960